Simon Colosimo (born 8 January 1979) is an Australian former soccer player who played as a centre back and defensive midfielder.

He spent two years playing in Europe with spells in the Premier League with Manchester City and in the Belgian First Division for Royal Antwerp. Aside a spells with Pahang FA in 2004 and Sivasspor in 2007, the rest of his career was spent in his native Australia notably in the A-League with South Melbourne, Perth Glory, Parramatta Power and Sydney FC. He also played for Carlton SC, Melbourne Heart, Dempo, Goulburn Valley Suns, Werribee City, Dandenong Thunder, Whittlesea Ranges, Bulleen Lions. He was capped 26 times by Australia, scoring 3 goals.

Club career

NSL years
Colosimo completed the Australian Institute of Sport football program in 1997 and signed with new National Soccer League club Carlton for their inaugural year.  Interest had been shown from Bayern Munich and Panathinaikos to sign Colosimo, but a knee injury sustained in a horror tackle by Andy Cole while on Socceroos duty kept him out of the game for most of the 1999/00 season, but made his return on 14 March 2000 to score against South Melbourne, who would eventually acquire the midfielder after the demise of the Carlton club.

After a year at Souths, he sought a move to Europe and joined English side Manchester City for a season followed by a move to Belgium with Royal Antwerp.  Unable to settle, he returned to Australia in 2002 to join Perth Glory in the NSL for a season, then moved to Parramatta Power until the demise of the league in 2004.

Along with a number of Australian players he made a move into Asia in the newly restructured Malaysia Super League at Pahang FA, helping them win the 2004 championship.

A-League career
He was enticed back to Australia with the relaunch of the A-League returning to Perth Glory signing a three-year deal.  Colosimo received MVP for Perth Glory for the 2006–07 season.

Colosimo joined Turkish club Sivasspor on a four-month loan during the A-League off-season, and returned to Perth Glory for the start of the 2007–08 A-League season, and was handed the Perth Glory captaincy.

With his contract at Glory at an end, Colosimo was linked with a move to Sydney FC in 2008, receiving a hostile reception from Perth supporters who let him know he was no longer welcome and was dropped from the starting side for some final matches. Unable to reach a contract agreement, Perth released him from the club on 22 January 2008.

It was announced by Sydney FC that Colosimo had signed a two-year deal, and he joined the club from the start of the 2008–09 season. Colosimo became a standout performer as a centreback, with consistent performances impressing through the new 2009–10 season. On 31 March 2010, the defender switched clubs to Melbourne Heart, along with his teammates Clint Bolton and John Aloisi. He became the captain of the new club and scored one goal in their debut season, an important equaliser against Adelaide in the final minutes of the game, which Heart triumphed 2–1 in stoppage time.

As a result of the Heart finishing second-to-last on the A-League ladder, their worst finish in an A-League season, Colosimo, along with teammates Clint Bolton, Matt Thompson and Fred, were released by the Heart at the conclusion of the 2012–13 A-League season.

International career
Colosimo first entered the Australian national selection framework at Under-20 level in 1997 while at the AIS.  This led quickly to a national team debut in 1998 against Fiji at just 19 years of age.  He remained in the national focus, selected as part of the squad at the 1999 FIFA World Youth Championship.

Later that year he was called up by then Socceroo manager Raul Blanco to make an appearance in the Socceroo's friendly against Manchester United on 18 July at the MCG.  What started as a spirited game finished in horror for Simon, as Andy Cole lunged into a tackle with his leg raised and studs showing, felling the Australian midfielder in full-flight. Simon was stretchered off in pain by stewards, and was diagnosed with having sustained tears to his anterior cruciate and medial ligaments, needing a complete knee reconstruction. He underwent surgery soon after, which included his anterior cruciate being replaced with a piece of his hamstring tendon. A rehabilitation process began, in which Simon would not kick a ball for six months.  There was talk at the time of impending legal action against Cole by Carlton's General Manager Lou Sticca, though no formal proceedings were ever entered into.

Following his recovery, he was selected for the 2000 Summer Olympics in Sydney, and was part of the national team squad for the 2005 FIFA Confederations Cup.  Colosimo was selected in matches leading up to the 2007 AFC Asian Cup, but was not included in the squad for the final tournament although he was named as a standby reserve.

Personal life
Colosimo is of Italian descent, and has a wife named  Bianca, with whom he has two children. Simon attended St Monica’s College in Epping up until year 10 as he then moved to the AIS in Canberra for a scholarship His younger brother Anthony Colosimo played in the youth of Melbourne Knights FC and with Bulleen Lions.

National team statistics

Summary

International goals

Honours 

Perth Glory
 NSL Championship: 2002–03Pahang FA Malaysia Super League: 2004Sydney FC A-League Premiership: 2009–10
 A-League Championship: 2009–10Australia OFC Nations Cup: 2000, 2004
 OFC U-20 Championship: 1997, 1998Individual'''
 Joe Marston Medal: 2003, 2010
 Perth Glory Most Glorious Player Award: 2006–07
 PFA A-League Team of the Season: 2009–10

References

External links
 Melbourne Heart profile
 Oz Football profile

1979 births
Living people
Soccer players from Melbourne
Australian people of Italian descent
People of Calabrian descent
Australian expatriate soccer players
Australia international soccer players
Olympic soccer players of Australia
Carlton S.C. players
Manchester City F.C. players
Parramatta Power players
Perth Glory FC players
Royal Antwerp F.C. players
Sivasspor footballers
South Melbourne FC players
Sydney FC players
Melbourne City FC players
National Soccer League (Australia) players
Sri Pahang FC players
Dempo SC players
English Football League players
Süper Lig players
Expatriate footballers in Turkey
Expatriate footballers in England
Expatriate footballers in India
Australian expatriate sportspeople in Turkey
Australian expatriate sportspeople in England
Australian expatriate sportspeople in India
1998 OFC Nations Cup players
2000 OFC Nations Cup players
Footballers at the 2000 Summer Olympics
2004 OFC Nations Cup players
2005 FIFA Confederations Cup players
Australian Institute of Sport soccer players
Goulburn Valley Suns FC players
Association football defenders
Australian soccer players
Australian expatriate sportspeople in Malaysia
Expatriate footballers in Malaysia